Chander Narayanan (born 18 August 1947) is an Indian former boxer. He competed in the men's flyweight event at the 1972 Summer Olympics.

References

External links
 

1947 births
Living people
Indian male boxers
Olympic boxers of India
Boxers at the 1972 Summer Olympics
Place of birth missing (living people)
Asian Games medalists in boxing
Boxers at the 1974 Asian Games
Asian Games bronze medalists for India
Medalists at the 1974 Asian Games
Flyweight boxers
Commonwealth Games medallists in boxing
Commonwealth Games silver medallists for India
Boxers at the 1974 British Commonwealth Games
Medallists at the 1974 British Commonwealth Games